Salmin Kasimu Maengo (born 9 May 1995), popularly known by his producer-artist name S2KIZZY, is a Tanzanian record producer and songwriter. He is best known for producing Bongo Flava songs "Amaboko" by Diamond Platnumz, and "Tetema" by Rayvanny. He has produced albums for and overseen the careers of Diamond Platnumz, Rayvanny, Bill Nass and Vanessa Mdee. He is credited as a 'super-producer' in contemporary Bongo-Flava, Bongo-Trap, Afrobeats and Afro-pop.

Career
Maengo is the founder and current CEO of Pluto Records, but works predominantly with WCB (Wasafi Classic Baby).

Amber Rose may be working on a project with him.

Early life and career beginnings
Salmin, named after the late President of Zanzibar Salmin Amour, was born in Mbeya, and raised by his auntie as her own. His mother passed away when he was 3 years old, shortly after which his father left and remarried. He was raised a Muslim.

His interest in music begin early, and during primary school he started to learn how to play the drums. Later, during his secondary years he attended a boarding school in Morogoro, Tanzania. He used this opportunity to borrow his friends laptop which he used to self-teach music production. He would tell his auntie that he needed to stay in the school during the holidays as punishment, to insure that he had time to focus on improving his craft.

He has described in several interviews the struggles he faced at the start of his career.

Events
In 2020 there was a break-in at his studio in Dar es Salaam which was widely reported. Then President of Tanzania, John Pombe Joseph Magufuli, vouched to find the responsible party and government representatives personally investigated the matter.

In 2021 when the late president of Tanzania, John Pombe Magufuli, passed S2Kizzy produced a song to commemorate his legacy featuring several Tanzanian artistes. The collaboration was widely reported and featured artists such as: Zuchu, Ben Pol, Diamond Platnumz, Rayvanny, Jux, Queen Darleen, Lava Lava and Marioo, amongst others.

Awards and nominations

Produced songs and features

References

1995 births
Tanzanian Muslims
Living people
21st-century Tanzanian male singers
Tanzanian producers
People from Dar es Salaam
 Tanzanian Bongo Flava musicians
 Swahili-language singers